David Hart may refer to:

 Dave Hart (c. 1925–2009), American football coach, college athletics administrator
 David Berry Hart (1851–1920), Scottish surgeon and professor
 David Hart (actor) (born 1954), American actor
 David Hart (footballer) (born 1964), Australian rules footballer
 David Hart (poet) (fl. 2000s), British poet (see News from the Republic of Letters)
 David Ananda Hart (fl. c. 2000), British radical theologian, Anglican priest and convert to Hinduism
 David Bentley Hart (born 1965), Eastern Orthodox theologian and cultural commentator
 David Hart (political activist) (1944–2011), British right-wing political activist and avant-garde film maker
 David Hart Smith (born 1985), Canadian professional wrestler
 David Liebe Hart (born 1955), American entertainer
 David Hart (water polo) (born 1952), water polo player and coach
 David Montgomery Hart (1927–2000), American anthropologist

See also 
 David Harte (disambiguation)